Ekaterina Olegovna Vedeneeva (born 23 June 1994) is a Russian individual rhythmic gymnast competing for Slovenia since 2018. She made her debut for Slovenia in August 2018 at the World Cup event in Kazan, Russian Federation. On national level, she is a three-time (2019, 2021, 2022) Slovenian National All-around champion. In 2021, she became  the first Slovenian rhythmic gymnast to compete at Summer Olympics in Tokyo. She is the first Slovenian rhythmic gymnast and first Slovenian gymnast of any discipline to win a medal in the history of The World Games.

Career
Her mother, Julia Vedeneeva, has coached rhythmic gymnastics and encouraged her to take up the sport. She started training rhythmic gymnastics in her hometown Irkutsk in Russia.

In 2015, Vedeneeva was selected to represent Russia together with Maria Titova at the 2015 Summer Universiade in Gwangju, South Korea. She finished on 5th place in All-around competition, tied with Elizaveta Nazarenkova. She qualified to finals with two apparatuses, placing 5th in Ball final with score 17.550 and 7th in Clubs final with score 17.250.

2017-2020 Olympic cycle

In 2018, she chose to represent Slovenia. On July 31, she officially received her Slovenian citizenship. This gave her the opportunity to start competing at international competitions. In August, she competed at World Cup Kazan in Russia. Katya placed 8th in All-around and qualified to two apparatus finals, where she placed 5th with Hoop (18.950) and 7th with Ball (17.800). In September, she competed at the 2018 World Championships, which was her first one. She helped Slovenia to achieve the best result in Team competition so far, placing 11th together with teammates Aleksandra Podgoršek and Anja Tomazin. She also placed 17th in All-Around Qualifications and qualified to the All-Around Final where she placed 13th, which is also the best result for Slovenia.

In April 2019 she became the first Slovenian to earn a medal at the Rhythmic Gymnastics World Cup, a bronze medal in the ribbon final at the Tashkent World Cup. At the 2019 European Rhythmic Gymnastics Championships, in Baku, Azerbaijan, she qualified for the club final finishing in 7th place.  That same year she became the first Slovenian to win a medal at the Rhythmic Gymnastics Grand Prix, a silver medal in the ball final at the Holon Grand Prix in Israel. At the 2019 World Championships in Baku, Azerbaijan she qualified to the Individual All-Around Final, where she placed 17th with total score of 78.650 and secured Slovenia the first ever Olympic spot in history of rhythmic gymnastics.

In 2020, she started the season at Grand Prix in Moscow, where she placed 6th in All-Around competition. The next day, she competed in all Apparatus Finals and won bronze medal in ribbon final with a score of 19.900. This was her second Grand Prix medal. She represented Slovenia at the 2020 European Championships in Kyiv, Ukraine and finished on 13th place in All-around.

In 2021, she started the season at Grand Prix in Moscow, where she placed 8th in All-Around competition. On Sunday, she qualified to all apparatus finals and won bronze medal in ribbon final with score 22.050, repeating her 2020 success. During the 2021 World Cup series, Vedeneeva qualified for an Olympic berth. She was the highest ranked eligible gymnast, in front of Uzbekistan's Sabina Tashkenbaeva and Japan's Chisaki Oiwa. At the Moscow World Challenge Cup she won bronze in the All-around - the first World Cup all-around medal for Slovenia. The following day she added 3 more bronze medals in ball, clubs and ribbon.

At the 2020 Olympic Games, Vedeneeva finished sixteenth in the qualification round for the individual all-around, behind Alexandra Agiurgiuculese.

At the end of October, she competed at the 2021 Rhythmic Gymnastics World Championships in Kitakyushu, Japan, making it to the top 18 individual final, finishing in 12th place, behind Khrystyna Pohranychna. She also managed to qualify for the ribbon final, achieving 7th place. It was the first time that a Slovenian gymnast has managed to advance to a world championship apparatus final.

2022
On 14-18 September, Katja competed at her fourth World Championships, which were held in Sofia, Bulgaria. On first day of competition, she took 9th place in Hoop qualifications and did not advance into finals, but she did qualify to Ball final and placed 6th. Next day, she took 2nd place in Clubs qualifications, but ended on 8th place in Final after some mistakes. She did however, end on 3rd place in Ribbon final and won her first ever medal from World Championships and also first medal for Slovenia at Rhythmic Gymnastics World Championships. In Individual All-around Qualifications she took 6th place and advanced to Individual All-around Final, where she finished on 7th place, which was her best result so far.

Gymnastics technique

Vedeneeva is known for her routines which demonstrate a strong grounding in classical ballet technique, in particular for her well-executed pirouettes which are distinctively often performed a la seconde. Her signature moves in this position include pivots completed in arabesque, attitude and ring style. Vedeneeva, whilst incredibly talented, has also expressed the challenges of incorporating enough apparatus difficulty elements in a routine to both preserve the artistic integrity of the sport and to accumulate enough marks to be competitive and fair in the new open-ended marking system which, she believes, preferences the former.

Achievements 
 First Slovenian rhythmic gymnast to win a medal in an individual apparatus final at the FIG World Cup series.
 First Slovenian rhythmic gymnast to win a gold medal in an individual apparatus final at the FIG World Cup series.
 First Slovenian rhythmic gymnast to win a medal in an individual All-around at the FIG World Cup series.
 First Slovenian rhythmic gymnast to compete at the Olympic Games.
 First Slovenian rhythmic gymnast or Slovenian gymnast of any discipline to win a medal at the World Games.
 First Slovenian rhythmic gymnast to win a medal at the World Championship.

Routine music information

Competitive highlights
(Team competitions in seniors are held only at the World Championships, Europeans and other Continental Games.)

References

External links
 
 

1994 births
Living people
Russian rhythmic gymnasts
Slovenian rhythmic gymnasts
Sportspeople from Irkutsk
Naturalized citizens of Slovenia
Slovenian people of Russian descent
Olympic gymnasts of Slovenia
Gymnasts at the 2020 Summer Olympics
Competitors at the 2022 World Games
World Games bronze medalists
Medalists at the Rhythmic Gymnastics World Championships